Frazer Morris (born 22 February 1997) is an English professional rugby league footballer who plays as a  for the Hunslet RLFC in the Betfred League 1.

Morris played for Wakefield Trinity (Heritage № 1375) in the Super League.

Whilst at Halifax in 2019 he spent a loan spell at Oldham (Heritage № 1411).

References

External links
 (archived by web.archive.org) Halifax profile
 (archived by web.archive.org) Wakefield Trinity profile

1997 births
Living people
Dewsbury Rams players
English rugby league players
Halifax R.L.F.C. players
Hunslet R.L.F.C. players
Newcastle Thunder players
Oldham R.L.F.C. players
Rugby league props
Wakefield Trinity players